Hemimeris sabulosa is a species of flowering plant in the figwort family. It is endemic to the Cape Provinces of South Africa.

References 

Scrophulariaceae
Flora of South Africa
Endemic flora of South Africa